Kühner, also spelled Kuehner, and sometimes anglicised as Kuhner, is a German surname.

Notable people with this surname include:
 Herbert Kuhner (born 1935) is an Austrian writer and translator
 Jeff Kuhner (born 1969), Canadian-American radio host
 Jochen Kühner (born 1980), German rower
 Jody Kuehner (born c. 1980), better known as Cherdonna Shinatra, American dancer
 Martin Kühner (born 1980), German rower
 Nikolai Kuehner (1877-1955), Soviet scientist
 Raphael Kühner (1802-1878), German classical scholar
 Robert Kühner (1903-1996), French mycologist
 Sebastian Kühner (born 1987), German volleyball player